Xuanzang Temple, may refer to:

Xuanzang Temple (Nanjing), Buddhist temple in  Xuanwu District, Nanjing, Jiangsu, China
Xuanzang Temple (Taiwan), Buddhist temple in Nantou County, Taiwan

Buddhist temple disambiguation pages